Arron Rhys Davies (born 22 June 1984) is a Welsh former professional footballer who played as a midfielder. He made one appearance for the Wales national team.

Early life 
Davies was brought up in Llantwit Major, where he attended Llantwit Major Comprehensive School.

Club career

Southampton 
Davies joined Southampton's Centre of Excellence at Bath before moving up to the Academy. He made his first appearance for the reserves in September 2001 and became a regular for the Saints reserves in the 2002–03 season after moving from the wing to a striking role. Between March and April 2003 he scored 4 times in 5 reserve games, which brought him to the attention of first team manager Gordon Strachan. Strachan named Davies in his initial 20-man squad for the 2003 FA Cup final, however he failed to make the bench. Davies also travelled to Bucharest for Saints' UEFA Cup tie.

Although seemingly on the verge of breaking into the senior team, Davies never made a first team appearance for Southampton. In February 2004, he went on loan to Second Division side Barnsley. On 14 February 2004 he made his debut for Barnsley  in a 1–0 loss against Wrexham.

Davies was released by Southampton following the arrival of new manager Harry Redknapp in December 2004.

Yeovil Town 

On 16 December 2004, Davies moved to League Two side Yeovil Town on a free transfer

On 18 December 2004, Davies scored the winning goal on his debut in a 3–2 victory over Leyton Orient. On 29 January 2005, Davies scored in a 3–2 loss against Charlton Athletic in the fourth round of the FA Cup.

In February 2005, Davies scored in four consecutive matches against Chester City, Scunthorpe United, Grimsby Town and Northampton Town. Yeovil finished the 2004–05 season as champions of League Two and won promotion to League One.

Davies blossomed during 2005–06, where he scored 8 goals in 39 appearances. On 4 March 2006, he scored a hat-trick against Chesterfield in a 3–0 victory. At the end of the season, Davies signed a new two-year contract with Yeovil, keeping him at the club until 2008.

In 2006–07, Davies scored 6 league goals. On 18 May 2007, he scored twice in Yeovil's 5–2 Football League One Play-off semi-final win against Nottingham Forest at the City Ground. His goals helped Yeovil to a 5–4 aggregate win. 27 May 2007, Yeovil lost 2–0 against Blackpool on in the League One Play-off Final.

Nottingham Forest 
6 July 2007, Davies moved to League One side Nottingham Forest in a combined £1.2m deal with teammate Chris Cohen. On 6 July 2007, he signed a three-year contract.

Davies missed the start of the 2007–08 season due to injury. 30 October 2007, He made his debut as a substitute in a 0–0 draw against Oldham. He scored his first goal for the club in a 2–0 win against Crewe Alexandra. Unfortunately, injuries limited the number of appearances Davies made for The Reds. Forest finished the season in second place and won gained promotion to the Championship.

Davies' appearances were again limited due to injury during the 2008–09 season.

On 1 September 2009, Davies signed on loan with League One side Brighton & Hove Albion until the end of the year. However, after only 7 appearances, Brighton terminated his loan on 2 December 2009.

On 19 January 2010, Davies, along with James Reid, Aaron Mitchell and Joe Heath, had his contract terminated by mutual consent.

Return to Yeovil 
In January 2010, a proposed move to join his former club, Yeovil Town, collapsed due to FIFA regulations which state that a player "may only play for two clubs in any one season where he has been on contract or a standard loan". This prevented Davies from signing for a third club during the season.

To avoid these regulations, Davies signed on non-contract terms with Brighton & Hove Albion on 11 February 2010. Once signed, he was loaned to Yeovil for the remainder of the season.

Peterborough United 
On 9 July 2010, Davies was signed by former boss Gary Johnson for Peterborough United on a two-year contract.

On 7 August 2010, Davies made his debut in a 3–0 win against Bristol Rovers. On 4 September 2010, Davies sustained a hamstring injury in a 1–0 loss against Tranmere Rovers. He was sidelined for three weeks following the match.

On 2 November 2010, Davies scored his first goal in over three years in a 3–1 win over against Walsall. Peterborough were promoted to the Championship at the end of the season after beating Huddersfield 3-0 in the play-off final.

Davies was transfer listed and then had his contract terminated by mutual consent by new manager Darren Ferguson at the end of the 2010–11 season.

Northampton Town 
On 30 June 2011, Davies was signed by Gary Johnson for a third time at League Two side Northampton Town.

On 6 August 2011, Davies made his debut for the club in a 0–0 draw against Accrington Stanley. On 20 August 2011, Davies scored his first goal in a 3–2 loss against Cheltenham Town.

Gary Johnson was sacked in mid-November 2011 and replaced by Aidy Boothroyd. Under Boothroyd, Davies' first team opportunities were limited.

On 4 July 2012, Davies had his contract terminated with Northampton Town by mutual consent.

Exeter City 
On 5 July 2012, Davies signed with League Two side Exeter City.

On 19 October 2013, Davies scored a spectacular dipping long range effort from the sideline against Scunthorpe United in a 4–0 away victory. The goal was voted by Exeter supporters as the club's goal of the season.

Davies left Exeter at the end of the 2015–16 season after the club could not afford to offer him a new contract.

Accrington Stanley 
On 1 August 2016, Davies joined fellow League Two side Accrington Stanley on a one-year contract. He scored his first goal for Accrington in a 2–1 loss to Exeter City on 20 August 2016.

International career 
Davies has represented his country at all levels including captaining Wales at under-21 level.

He earned his only senior international cap for Wales as a substitute in a 2–1 friendly victory against Trinidad and Tobago.

Career statistics

Club

International

Honours 
Yeovil Town
 League Two Champions: 2004–05
 League One Play-off Finalists: 2006–07

Nottingham Forest
 League One Runners-up: 2007–08

Peterborough United
 League One Play-off Winners: 2010–11

References

External links 

 
 Photo gallery whilst with Wales under-21 team
  Profile on Yeovil Town fansite

1984 births
Living people
Footballers from Cardiff
Association football defenders
Welsh footballers
Wales youth international footballers
Wales under-21 international footballers
Wales international footballers
Southampton F.C. players
Barnsley F.C. players
Yeovil Town F.C. players
Nottingham Forest F.C. players
Brighton & Hove Albion F.C. players
Peterborough United F.C. players
Northampton Town F.C. players
Exeter City F.C. players
Accrington Stanley F.C. players
English Football League players